
Year 6 BC was a common year starting on Sunday or Monday (link will display the full calendar) of the Julian calendar (the sources differ, see leap year error for further information) and a common year starting on Friday of the Proleptic Julian calendar. At the time, it was known as the Year of the Consulship of Balbus and Vetus (or, less frequently, year 748 Ab urbe condita). The denomination 6 BC for this year has been used since the early medieval period, when the Anno Domini calendar era became the prevalent method in Europe for naming years.

Events

By place

Roman Empire 
 Tiberius Claudius Nero is sent to Armenia, then retires to Rhodes.
 Emperor Augustus sends ferrets (named viverrae by Plinius) to the Balearic Islands to control the rabbit plagues.

Births 
 Unknown – Possible birthdate of Jesus

Deaths 
 Lady Ban (or Ban Jieyu), Chinese concubine and poet (b. 48 BC)
 Cleopatra Selene II, Ptolemaic princess of Egypt (approximate date)
 Feng Yuan (or Zhaoyi), Chinese concubine of the Han Dynasty
 Liu Xiang, Chinese scholar, editor of Shan Hai Jing and compiler of Lienü zhuan, father of Liu Xin (b. 77 BC)
 Soseono, Korean queen of Goguryeo (b. 67 BC)

References